George Kenneth Hotson Younger, 4th Viscount Younger of Leckie, Baron Younger of Prestwick,  (22 September 1931 – 26 January 2003), was a British Conservative Party politician and banker.

Early life and career
Younger's forebear, George Younger (baptised 1722), was the founder of George Younger and Son of Alloa, the family's brewing business (not to be confused with Younger's of Edinburgh). Younger's great-grandfather, George Younger, was created Viscount Younger of Leckie in 1923. Younger was the eldest of the three sons of Edward Younger, 3rd Viscount Younger of Leckie.

He was born in Stirling in 1931 and educated at Cargilfield Preparatory School, Winchester College, and New College, Oxford, where he obtained a Master's degree. Joining the British Army, he served in the Korean War with the Argyll & Sutherland Highlanders. On 7 August 1954, he married Diana Tuck, daughter of a Royal Navy captain. They had four children, including James Younger, who succeeded his father to the Viscountcy.

Political career
He first stood for Parliament, unsuccessfully, in North Lanarkshire in the 1959 general election. Subsequently, he was initially selected to stand for the Kinross and West Perthshire seat in a by-election in late 1963, but agreed to stand aside to allow the new Prime Minister Alec Douglas-Home the chance to enter the House of Commons.

Following in the footsteps of his great-grandfather the 1st Viscount, Younger became Member of Parliament for Ayr in 1964 and served as Margaret Thatcher's Secretary of State for Scotland for seven years. He subsequently succeeded Michael Heseltine as Secretary of State for Defence in 1986 when Heseltine resigned from the cabinet over a dispute about helicopters known as the Westland affair. In the 1987 general election, as part of a considerable swing away from the Conservatives in Scotland, he retained his seat after three recounts, by a majority of just 182 votes (having been almost 8,000 votes in 1983). Incidentally, it was held by his successor Phil Gallie by an even smaller majority of 85 votes in 1992.

Later years
Younger quit the cabinet in 1989, and joined the Royal Bank of Scotland, becoming its chairman in 1992. He was created a life peer as Baron Younger of Prestwick, of Ayr in the District of Kyle and Carrick, on 7 July 1992, five years before succeeding to the viscountcy. As such, he continued to sit in the House of Lords after the passage of the House of Lords Act 1999 which expelled most of the hereditary peers. In 1995, the Queen appointed him a knight of the Order of the Thistle. Younger was Chancellor of Edinburgh's Napier University from 1993 until his death, and Commissioner to the General Assembly of the Church of Scotland for 2001 and 2002.

References

Sources
 Torrance, David, The Scottish Secretaries (Birlinn 2006)
Burke's Peerage & Baronetage (106th edition, 1999). Editor-in-chief: Charles Mosley; publisher: Burke's Peerage (Genealogical Books) Ltd.

External links
 
 Lord Younger dies after cancer battle – BBC News article, dated Sunday, 26 January 2003.
 Lord Younger: A career in politics – BBC News article, dated Sunday, 26 January 2003.
 Tribute paid to 'Gentleman George' – BBC News article, dated Sunday, 26 January 2003.
 Marlow (Scotland) Lectures – IESIS website, retrieved 27 May 2012.

|-

|-

|-

|-

1931 births
2003 deaths
Alumni of New College, Oxford
Argyll and Sutherland Highlanders officers
British Army personnel of the Korean War
Deaths from cancer in Scotland
Scottish Conservative Party MPs
Deputy Lieutenants of Stirlingshire
Knights Commander of the Royal Victorian Order
Knights of the Thistle
Lords High Commissioner to the General Assembly of the Church of Scotland
Members of the Privy Council of the United Kingdom
Members of the Parliament of the United Kingdom for Scottish constituencies
People educated at Cargilfield School
People educated at Winchester College
People associated with Edinburgh Napier University
Secretaries of State for Defence (UK)
Secretaries of State for Scotland
Viscounts in the Peerage of the United Kingdom
UK MPs 1964–1966
UK MPs 1966–1970
UK MPs 1970–1974
UK MPs 1974
UK MPs 1974–1979
UK MPs 1979–1983
UK MPs 1983–1987
UK MPs 1987–1992
UK MPs who inherited peerages
Conservative Party (UK) hereditary peers
Conservative Party (UK) life peers
NatWest Group people
Fellows of the Royal Scottish Geographical Society
Presidents of the Royal Scottish Geographical Society
Unionist Party (Scotland) MPs
Younger
Life peers created by Elizabeth II
Younger of Leckie